Sinia is a genus of butterflies in the family Lycaenidae first described by Walter Forster in 1940. The species of this genus are found in the far eastern Palearctic realm.

Species
Sinia leechi (Forster, 1940) China
The shijimiaeoides species group
Sinia divina (Fixsen, 1887) Korea, Japan, Amur Oblast, Ussuri  This largest species of the present group is above almost spotted like Scolitantides orion; the underside is more sparsely spotted than in S. orion, but the spots of the forewing beneath are so heavy that they are almost united into a band.
Sinia lanty (Oberthür, 1886) Tibet, western China
S. l. honei (Forster, 1940) Batang, Tibet
S. l. pomena Huang, 1998 western Tibet, southeast Tibet

References

External links

Polyommatini
Lycaenidae genera
Taxa named by Walter Forster (entomologist)